Tat Qeshlaq (also Romanized as Tāt Qeshlāq; also known as Ţātqeshlāqī) is a village in Oryad Rural District, in the Central District of Mahneshan County, Zanjan Province, Iran. At the 2006 census, its population was 261, in 54 families.

References 

Populated places in Mahneshan County